Otavi railway station is located in the mining town of Otavi in Namibia central Otjozondjupa Region. It is served by a mostly freight railway and limited number of passenger service. The extension of the railway towards the east to Grootfontein is exclusively for freight service.

Nearest airport 
The nearest airports are Ondangwa Airport at Ondangwa, Tsumeb Airport at Tsumeb, and Otjiwarongo Airport at Otjiwarongo.

List of airports in Namibia

Adjacent station(s) 
 (north) - Tsumeb railway station, Oshikango railway station
 (south) - Otjiwarongo railway station
 (east)  - Grootfontein railway station

See also

References

External links 
Official site

Buildings and structures in Otjozondjupa Region
Railway stations in Namibia
TransNamib Railway